René Rutschmann (born 7 January 1941) is a former Swiss cyclist. He competed at the 1960 Summer Olympics and the 1964 Summer Olympics.

References

External links
 

1941 births
Living people
Swiss male cyclists
Olympic cyclists of Switzerland
Cyclists at the 1960 Summer Olympics
Cyclists at the 1964 Summer Olympics
People from Winterthur
Sportspeople from the canton of Zürich